The Maroonbook is a system of legal citation that is intended to be simpler and more straightforward than the more widely used Bluebook. It was developed at the University of Chicago and is the citation system for the University of Chicago Law Review. As a simplified and modernized citation method, it tends to be closer to the Oxford Standard for Citation of Legal Authorities in its conventions.

Conventions
The Maroonbook gives the following examples:

 (1) Case names

 See Ferdinand v Isabella, 14 US 92, 96–98 (1492).

 (2) Titles of periodical articles and articles in edited books

 Eppard Richstein, Elements of Liberty, 21 U Chi L Rev 45, 60 (1954).

 (3) Book and treatise titles

 Friedrich W. Nietzsche, On Truth and Lie in an Extramoral Sense 365 (Oxford 1957) (Edith P. Honeywell, trans).

See also
OSCOLA
Bluebook
ALWD Citation Manual
BabyBlue
The Indigo Book

References

External links
 

Legal citation guides
University of Chicago Press books